Nußdorf ob der Traisen is a municipality in the district of Sankt Pölten-Land in Lower Austria, Austria.

Population

References

Cities and towns in St. Pölten-Land District